Lana Alekseyevna Prusakova (born 10 June 2000) is a Russian freestyle skier who competes internationally.
 
She competed in the World Championships 2017, and participated at the 2018 Winter Olympics.

References

External links

 

2000 births
Living people
People from Novocheboksarsk
Russian female freestyle skiers
Olympic freestyle skiers of Russia
Freestyle skiers at the 2018 Winter Olympics
Freestyle skiers at the 2016 Winter Youth Olympics
Universiade gold medalists for Russia
Universiade medalists in freestyle skiing
Competitors at the 2019 Winter Universiade
Youth Olympic gold medalists for Russia
Sportspeople from Chuvashia
21st-century Russian women